Charles Baumann (March 26, 1896 – August 18, 1930) was an American racecar driver.

Biography
Baumann was born on March 26, 1896 in Indianapolis, Indiana. He participated in the 1927 Indianapolis 500.

The correct spelling is Baumann (two n's)

Bauman qualified for the 1928 Indianapolis 500 but suffered a crash during a practice run on the morning of the race. He served as a relief driver for Tony Gulotta.

He died on August 18, 1930 in Kankakee, Illinois during the first lap of a 15-mile race when he was thrown from his car and impaled on a fence rail. In the same race, Evron Salpaugh broke his arm when he was thrown from his auto.

Wife Beulah Baumann, Son, Charles Baumann, 3 granddaughters, Kim Mc Adams, Karla Williams and Karol Lahrman, 7 great-grandchildren, Shane McAdams, Jessica Dixon, Lyndsy Lahrman, Boomer Lahrman, Kayla Williams, Luke Williams and Mary Williams

Indianapolis 500 results

References

External links
Dutch Bauman image
 FB Page

1896 births
1930 deaths
Racing drivers from Indianapolis
Indianapolis 500 drivers
Sportspeople from Clifton, New Jersey
Racing drivers from New Jersey
Racing drivers who died while racing
Sports deaths in Illinois